Henry Alexander Crabb (died April 7, 1857) was an American soldier and an early member of the California State Senate, who served during a term ending in 1854. He was a leader of the Whig party and was known as a pro-slavery activist. Crabb also married Filomena Ainsa and had 2 children with her. Crabb was an unsuccessful candidate for the United States Senate on the Know Nothing party ticket in 1856. After losing, he organized a filibustering expedition to the Mexican state of Sonora to aid the Liberal rebels in Mexico's ongoing Reform War, specifically the leader of the Liberals in Sonora, Ignacio Pesqueira. After Crabb crossed the border, however, Pesqueira turned on him, and Crabb's forces were defeated in an eight-day battle at Caborca in April 1857. The survivors, including Crabb, were captured and then executed by the rebels in what has been termed the Crabb massacre.

References

Sources
San Diego History article on Crabb

1857 deaths
California state senators
American filibusters (military)
American proslavery activists
American people murdered abroad
California Whigs
California Know Nothings
19th-century American politicians
Politicians from Nashville, Tennessee